Captain Lord William Stuart (18 November 1778 – 25 July 1814), was a British naval commander and Tory politician.

Early life 
Stuart was the fifth son of John Stuart, 1st Marquess of Bute, son of Prime Minister John Stuart, 3rd Earl of Bute. His mother was the Hon. Charlotte Jane, daughter of Herbert Windsor, 2nd Viscount Windsor. He served in the Royal Navy and achieved the rank of captain. In 1802 he was returned to Parliament for Cardiff, succeeding his elder brother Lord Evelyn Stuart, a seat he held until his death twelve years later.

Personal life 
Stuart married the Hon. Georgiana, daughter of Cornwallis Maude, 1st Viscount Hawarden, in 1806. They had one daughter, Georgiana, who died unmarried in 1833. His wife died in August 1807. Stuart never remarried and died in July 1814, aged only 35.

References

History of the Cardiff constituency at British History Online

External links 
 

1778 births
1814 deaths
Members of the Parliament of the United Kingdom for Cardiff constituencies
Royal Navy officers
Tory MPs (pre-1834)
UK MPs 1802–1806
UK MPs 1806–1807
UK MPs 1807–1812
UK MPs 1812–1818
Younger sons of marquesses
Royal Navy personnel of the French Revolutionary Wars
William